Karren L. More is an American materials scientist who is the Director of the Center for Nanophase Materials Sciences at the Oak Ridge National Laboratory. Her research considers advanced electron microscopy as a probe to understand the structure and chemistry of emerging materials. More is a Fellow of the American Ceramic Society and Microscopy Society of America.

Early life and education 
More earned her undergraduate degree and doctorate at North Carolina State University, where she worked under the supervision of Robert F. Davis. Her undergraduate course focused on civil engineering. She was the first person in her family to attend college, and became interested in what materials looked like at the nanoscale. She was later elected to the University's Hall of Fame. She started working at the Oak Ridge National Laboratory as a visiting researcher.

Research and career 
More joined the High Temperature Materials Laboratory (HTML) at the Oak Ridge National Laboratory in 1998. She was responsible for overseeing the Shared Research Equipment Program. Her research considers high-resolution electron microscopy of structural ceramics, polymer fuel cells and nanoparticle catalysts. She looks to correlate information about microstructure or composition with in situ testing. Through these experiments, she seeks to understand catalyst coarsening, carbon corrosion and membrane degradation.

In 2013, More was made group leader of the Electron & Atom Probe Microscopy Group, which she led for several years. In 2019, she was named Director of the Center for Nanophase Materials Sciences.

Awards and honors 
 2007 Elected Fellow of the American Ceramic Society
 2010 R&D 100 Award Team Member
 2013 DOE Hydrogen and Fuel Cells Program Research & Development Award
 2019 Elected Fellow of the Microscopy Society of America

Selected publications

References 

Living people
North Carolina State University alumni
Oak Ridge National Laboratory people
American materials scientists
20th-century American women scientists
21st-century American women scientists
Year of birth missing (living people)